Edward Polland (born 10 June 1947) is a Northern Irish professional golfer.

Polland was born in Newcastle, County Down. He turned professional in 1968 and won four times on the European Tour between 1973 and 1980. He played in the Ryder Cup in 1973.

Since turning fifty he has played on the European Seniors Tour, where he has won twice. He was third in the European Seniors Tour Order of Merit in 1998 and second in 1999.

Professional wins (10)

European Tour wins (4)

European Tour playoff record (0–1)

Other wins (4)
1970 Carroll's Irish Match Play Championship
1973 Irish Dunlop Tournament
1974 Irish PGA Championship
1975 Irish Dunlop Tournament

European Senior Tour wins (2)

European Senior Tour playoff record (0–3)

Playoff record
Senior PGA Tour playoff record (0–1)

Results in major championships

Note: Polland only played in The Open Championship.

CUT = missed the half-way cut (3rd round cut in 1974, 1977 and 1985 Open Championships)
"T" indicates a tie for a place

Team appearances
Ryder Cup (representing Great Britain & Ireland): 1973
World Cup (representing Ireland): 1973, 1974, 1976, 1977, 1978, 1979
Double Diamond International (representing Ireland): 1972, 1973, 1974, 1975, 1976, 1977
Marlboro Nations' Cup (representing Ireland): 1973
Sotogrande Match/Hennessy Cognac Cup (representing Great Britain and Ireland): 1974 (winners), 1976 (winners), 1978 (winners), 1980 (winners)
Praia d'El Rey European Cup: 1998 (tie), 1999

External links

Male golfers from Northern Ireland
European Tour golfers
European Senior Tour golfers
Ryder Cup competitors for Europe
Sportspeople from County Down
Sportspeople from Cádiz
1947 births
Living people